M'hamed Hassine Fantar (Ksar Hellal, October 1, 1936) is a professor of Ancient History of Archeology and History of Religion at Tunis University.

Biography
He was born in Ksar Hellal and received a BA in Classics from University of Strasbourg and a PhD in History from the Pantheon-Sorbonne University.

Within the National Institute of Archeology and Art, which later became the National Heritage Institute (Tunisia), he served as Research Director before becoming general manager between 1982 and 1987.  

Director of the Division of Museums, then Director of Center for the Study of Phoenician-Punic Civilization and Libyan Antiquities, he's the Founder of the  Revue des études phéniciennes-puniques et des antiquités libyques (Reppal).

Professor emeritus of the universities, he teaches archeology and history of the West-Semitic and Libyan religions at the university of Tunis. 

He's Member of the Association for the Promotion of Studies on Prehistoric, Ancient and Medieval North Africa, of the Committee on Historical and Scientific Works and the World Heritage Committee. He's also a Corresponding Member at the German Archaeological Institute, at the Real Academia de la Historia and at the Accademia dei Lincei.

President of the Tunisian Association for History and Archeology, he's the author of many books and a hundred of academic papers devoted to the 
Ancient Carthage.

Published works 
 Nouvelles tombes puniques découvertes sur les flancs de la colline du Borj Jedid à Carthage (Centro per le antichità e la storia dell'arte del Vicino: Rome, 1965)
 La Nécropole (Istituto di studi del Vicino Oriente: Rome, 1966)
 Eschatologie phénicienne-punique (Ministry of Culture: Tunis, 1970)
 Carthage : la prestigieuse cité d'Elissa (Maison tunisienne de l'édition: Tunis, 1970)
 Téboursouk : stèles anépigraphes et stèles à inscriptions néopuniques (Klincksieck: Paris, 1974)
 Le dieu de la mer chez les phéniciens et les puniques (Consiglio nazionale delle ricerche: Rome, 1977)
 L'Afrique du Nord dans l'Antiquité. Histoire et civilisation des origines au Ve siècle, with François Decret (Payot: Paris, 1981)
 Kerkouane, cité punique du cap Bon (Tunisie), « Cadre géographique et historique. La découverte » (Institut national d'archéologie et d'art: Tunis, 1984)
 Kerkouane, cité punique du cap Bon (Tunisie), « Architecture domestique » (Institut national d'archéologie et d'art: Tunis, 1985)
 Kerkouane, cité punique du cap Bon (Tunisie), « Sanctuaires et cultes. Société. Économie » (Institut national d'archéologie et d'art: Tunis, 1986)
 Kerkouane : une cité punique au Cap-Bon (Maison tunisienne de l'édition: Tunis, 1987)
 Le Bardo, un palais, un musée (Alif: Tunis, 1989)
 Carthage : les lettres et les arts (Alif: Tunis, 1991)
 Carthage : la cité punique (CNRS: Paris, 1995)
 Carthage : approche d'une civilisation (Alif: Tunis, 1993)
 Les Phéniciens en Méditerranée (Édisud: Aix-en-Provence, 1997)
 Kerkouane : cité punique au pays berbère de Tamezrat (Alif: Tunis, 1998)
 Carthage : la cité d'Hannibal (Gallimard: Paris, 2007)
 Stèles à inscriptions néopuniques de Maktar, with Maurice Sznycer (De Boccard: Paris, 2015)
 Le Bardo, la grande histoire de la Tunise, collectif work (Alif: Tunis, 2015)

Honours and awards

Honours 
 Commander of the Order of the Republic
 Grand Officer	of the National Order of Merit of Tunisia
 Officer of the National Order of Merit (France)
 Officer of the Order of Merit of the Italian Republic

Awards 
 Prize of the Académie Française
 Prize of the Académie des Inscriptions et Belles-Lettres
 Tunisian National Prize for Culture
 Sabatino Moscati's Award of History
 Tunisian Prize for Human Rights
 Tunisian Prize for Religious Studies
 Prize Amedeo Maiuri of Archeology

Honorary degrees 
 University of Bologna
 University of Sassari

References 

20th-century Tunisian historians
21st-century Tunisian historians
1936 births
Living people
Academic staff of Tunis University